One Romantic Night is a 1930 American pre-Code romantic comedy film directed by Paul L. Stein. It is the first sound film version of Ferenc Molnár's play The Swan, and marked silent screen star Lillian Gish's talkie debut. She starred as Princess Alexandra, with Conrad Nagel as the tutor who falls in love with her, and Rod La Rocque as Crown Prince Albert. The film was only fairly successful, though Gish would go on to become as highly regarded in talking pictures as she had been in silent films.

A silent version of the play had been produced in 1925 at Paramount Pictures. The 1956 Eastmancolor film version of The Swan, the only one of the three film versions made in color, is much more frequently shown today.

Cast
Lillian Gish as Princess Alexandra
Rod La Rocque as Prince Albert
Conrad Nagel as Dr Nicholas Haller
Marie Dressler as Princess Beatrice
O.P. Heggie as Father Benedict
Albert Conti as Count Lutzen
Edgar Norton as Colonel Wunderlich
Billie Bennett as Princess Symphorosa
Philippe De Lacy as Prince George
Byron Sage as Prince Arsene
Barbara Leonard as Mitzi

See also
 Lillian Gish filmography

External links

1930 films
1930 romantic comedy films
American romantic comedy films
Films directed by Paul L. Stein
Films based on works by Ferenc Molnár
American films based on plays
Films set in Europe
United Artists films
Remakes of American films
Sound film remakes of silent films
1930s English-language films
1930s American films